Dinamo National Olympic Stadium (Nacyjanalny Alimpijski stadyjon Dynama) is a multi-purpose stadium in Minsk, Belarus.  It was reopened after a renovation project. Earlier it was used mostly for football matches and was the home ground of Dinamo Minsk, FC Minsk and the Belarus national football team. Previously the stadium officially held 40,000, but because part of the upper stand had been abandoned in the mid-1990s for safety reasons, the actual capacity before renovations was 34,000. After renovation the capacity is only 22,246.

History 

Dinamo Stadium was constructed and opened in 1934 and then expanded in 1939. It was destroyed during the Second World War and rebuilt during the years 1947–1954. It was further renovated during 1978–1980 in preparation for 1980 Summer Olympics. In October 2012, the stadium was closed for major reconstruction works. It was reopened in December 2017 as a soccer-specific stadium,  in time for the 2019 European Games.

Domestic use 
During the Soviet years the stadium was a home venue for Dinamo Minsk, who continued to use the stadium until 2008. Since 2009, Dinamo Minsk has relocated to a smaller Dinamo-Yuni Stadium, while Dinamo Stadium became the primary home venue for FC Minsk. It hosted the final match of the Belarusian Cup, that was held there every year between 1992 and 2012, with the exception of 2002 and 2011.

International use 
The stadium was one of the venues of the football tournament at the 1980 Summer Olympics. It hosted six group phase matches and one quarterfinal. It was one of the venues at the 1984 UEFA European Under-18 Football Championship and at the 1985 FIFA U20 World Cup, both held in the Soviet Union. Since 1992, the stadium has been a primary home venue for the Belarus national football team.

References

External links 

Stadium profile at pressball.by
Stadium profile at FC Dinamo Minsk website
Stadium profile at FC Minsk website

Sports venues built in the Soviet Union
Football venues in the Soviet Union
Athletics (track and field) venues in the Soviet Union
Football venues in Belarus
Athletics (track and field) venues in Belarus
Sport in Minsk
Buildings and structures in Minsk
Sports venues completed in 1934
Belarus
Multi-purpose stadiums in Belarus
Venues of the 1980 Summer Olympics
Olympic football venues
FC Dinamo Minsk
1934 establishments in the Soviet Union